Paul Glover may refer to:

 Paul Glover (activist), American activist
 Paul Glover (actor), New Zealand actor